Manuel Andrada (January 9, 1890 – 1962) was an Argentine nine-goal polo player who won the gold medal in the 1936 Summer Olympics.

Early life

Manuel Andrada was born in 1890 on an estancia in Curumalal near Coronel Suárez, Buenos Aires Province, Argentina. He worked as a horse trainer and later took up polo.

Polo career
He was a nine-goaler. His team won the Pacific Coast Polo Championship in 1930. The following year, in 1931, he was on the winning team of the U.S. Open Polo Championship. Moreover, his team won the Campeonato Argentino Abierto de Polo in 1930, 1931, 1933, 1935, 1938 and 1939.

He was part of the Argentine polo team, which won the gold medal at the 1936 Summer Olympics. He played both matches in the tournament, the first against Mexico and the final against Great Britain. He was the oldest sportsman to receive an Olympic gold medal according to the Guinness World Records.

He was nicknamed "Paisano" (′peasant′). He has been called, "the first Argentine-born star player" by polo historian Horace Laffaye.

Personal life
He had three sons: Manuel, Oscar and Eduardo.

Death
He died in 1962 in Laguna del Sauce, Córdoba Province, Argentina.

Legacy
His descendants own the Paisano Polo Club in Río Cuarto, Córdoba Province, Argentina.

References

1890 births
1968 deaths
Sportspeople from Buenos Aires Province
Argentine polo players
Olympic gold medalists for Argentina
Olympic polo players of Argentina
Polo players at the 1936 Summer Olympics
Medalists at the 1936 Summer Olympics
Olympic medalists in polo